William Vincent Allen (January 28, 1847January 12, 1924) was an American jurist and twice a U.S. Senator from Nebraska.

Early life 
Allen was born in Midway, Ohio. He moved with his parents to Iowa in 1857, where he attended the common schools and Upper Iowa University at Fayette, Iowa.

He married Blanche Mott, born in Tidionte, Warren county, Pennsylvania, though most of her life was spent in Iowa. Her parents moved to that state when she was ten years old. Here she was educated, and married at Fayette, Iowa, to Hon. William V. Allen, May 9, 1870. Four children, three daughters (Lulu, Willa and Edith) and one son.

He served as a private with the 32nd Iowa Volunteer Infantry Regiment during the Civil War.

Political and legal career 
He then studied law at West Union, Iowa and was admitted to the bar in 1869. Allen practiced in Iowa until 1884 when he moved to Madison, Nebraska.  He served as judge of the district court of the ninth judicial district of Nebraska from 1891 to 1893.

Allen was the permanent chairman of the Populist State conventions in 1892, 1894 and 1896. Allen was elected as a Populist to the United States Senate by the Nebraska State Legislature and served from March 4, 1893, to March 3, 1899.  During his term, he served as the chairman of the Committee on Forest Reservations and Game Protection (Fifty-fourth and Fifty-fifth Congresses).  Allen championed various bills for public buildings and drought relief along the Missouri River Valley and authored the bill that would establish the 1898 Trans-Mississippi Exposition in Omaha, Nebraska.

Allen was an unsuccessful candidate for reelection in 1899. After that, he was appointed and subsequently elected judge of the district court of the ninth judicial district of Nebraska and served from March 9, 1899, to December 1899, when he resigned to return to the Senate, because he was appointed to fill the vacancy caused by the death of his successor, Monroe L. Hayward.  He served from December 13, 1899, to March 28, 1901, when a successor was elected; he was not a candidate for election to the vacancy.

Allen then resumed the practice of law in Madison, where he was again elected judge of the district court of the ninth judicial district of Nebraska in 1917 and served until his death.

Committee assignments
At various times during his tenure as a United States Senator, Allen served on 10 standing committees and 3 select or special committees. During his first term in the Senate, he chaired the Select Committee on Forest Reservations, and retained his chairmanship when the committee became the standing Committee on Forest Reservations and the Protection of Game during the 54th Congress. When he returned to the Senate for his second term during the 56th Congress, he was again appointed to this committee, but did not serve as chairman.

Death 
He died in Los Angeles, California on January 12, 1924, and was interred in Crown Hill Cemetery at Madison, Nebraska.

Works
 "Necessity of the People's Party," The Arena, vol. 30, no. 4 (Oct. 1903), pp. 410–414.

References 

Other sources used
 American National Biography
 Dictionary of American Biography

 at the Nebraska State Historical Society
 Coletta, Paolo E. "A Tempest in a Teapot? Governor Poynter's Appointment of William V. Allen to the United States Senate." Nebraska History, vol. 38 (June 1957), pp. 155–163.
 Hoelscher, David W.  "Genuine Populist: William V. Allen in the United States Senate, 1893-1901."   M.A. thesis, University of Nebraska at Omaha, 2003.

External links

 1898 bio w/photo
 

1847 births
1924 deaths
People from Madison County, Ohio
People's Party United States senators from Nebraska
Nebraska Populists
Upper Iowa University alumni
Nebraska state court judges
People from West Union, Iowa
People from Madison, Nebraska